The 2017–18 United States national rugby sevens team season included both the 2017–18 World Rugby Sevens Series and the 2018 Rugby World Cup Sevens. The season began badly. In the first tournament of the 2017–18 World Rugby Sevens Series in Dubai, 2017 World Rugby Player of the Year Perry Baker suffered a concussion, and the United States team limped to a last place finish. The U.S. improved from that point on, reaching the semifinals of the Australia Sevens. The team then won the 2018 USA Sevens, the first time the U.S. won their home tournament, boosted in large part by Perry Baker, who led all scorers with 8 tries. Baker, along with forwards Ben Pinkelman and Danny Barrett all made the tournament Dream Team. Overall the team displayed inconsistent performances, reaching the Cup semifinals three times, but also failing to qualify for the cup quarterfinals three times. Despite the inconsistent play, the U.S. finished sixth overall.

2017–18 World Sevens Series

Player statistics 
The following table shows the leading players for the U.S. after the 2017–18 Sevens Series season. Among all World Series, players, Isles ranked first in tries scored with 49, and Baker ranked fifth with 37. Ben Pinkelman ranked fourth in tackles with 124 and fourth in matches played with 58.

Source: World Rugby website.

2018 USA Sevens

The United States won the tournament by beating Argentina 28–0 in the final. This was the first time that the United States won its home tournament. USA's Perry Baker led the tournament with 8 tries and 11 breaks. Baker, Pinkelman, and Barrett were all named to the seven-man tournament Dream Team.

 Substitutes: Carlin Isles, Malon Aljiboori
 Unavailable due to injury: Madison Hughes, Stephen Tomasin, Maka Unufe

With the U.S. finishing out the game with a lineup that included Isles (wing), Baker (center), Williams (fly-half) and Aljiboori (forward), it is believed that this is the first time the U.S. has fielded a team where the majority of players are African-American.

2018 Rugby World Cup Sevens

{{Round4-with third
|RD2=5th Place Final
|Consol=7th Place

|
| | 0 | | 28
|
| | 26 | | 15

|

Round of 16

Quarterfinals

5th place semi-finals

5th place final

Head coach:  Mike Friday

See also
 2018 Rugby World Cup Sevens – Women's tournament

References

2017–18
United States
2018 in American rugby union
2017 in American rugby union